Erika Eloise Bricker (born May 23, 1949), also known by her married name Erika Holderith, is an American former competition swimmer and Pan American Games gold medalist.

At the 1964 Summer Olympics in Tokyo, Bricker represented the United States as a 15-year-old.  She swam for the gold medal-winning U.S. team in the preliminary heats of the women's 4×100-meter freestyle relay, but did not receive a medal.  Under the rules in effect in 1964, only those relay swimmers who competed in the event final were eligible to receive medals.

She also competed in the 1967 Pan American Games in Winnipeg, where she received a gold medal in the 100-meter freestyle, edging Marion Lay and Lillian Watson in the event final.

References

External links
 

1949 births
Living people
American female freestyle swimmers
Olympic swimmers of the United States
Pan American Games gold medalists for the United States
People from Woodland, California
Swimmers at the 1964 Summer Olympics
Swimmers at the 1967 Pan American Games
Pan American Games medalists in swimming
Medalists at the 1967 Pan American Games
20th-century American women